Onome is a Nigerian name of Urhobo descent meaning "my own". It may refer to:
 Bunichiro Onome (1863–1906), Japanese bureaucrat and journalist
 Glory Onome Nathaniel (born 1996), Nigerian athlete
 Onome Akinbode-James (born 2000), Nigerian basketball player
 Onome Ebi (born 1983), Nigerian footballer
 Onome Ojo (born 1977), American football player
 Onome Sodje (born 1988), Nigerian footballer
 Yung6ix (Onome Onokohwomo; born 1989), Nigerian hip hop artist